Ion Gribincea was a Romanian bobsledder who competed in the 1930s. He won a silver medal in the four-man event at the 1934 FIBT World Championships in Garmisch-Partenkirchen.

References
 Bobsleigh four-man world championship medalists since 1930

Possibly living people
Romanian male bobsledders
Year of birth missing